Edward Kizza (born 17 December 1998) is a Ugandan professional footballer who plays as a forward for Pittsburgh Riverhounds in the USL Championship.

Career
Born in Kampala, Kizza moved to the United States with his parents when he was 14. He spent his first year of high school at Carlisle School before joining the Montverde Academy near Orlando, Florida. With Montverde, Kizza was part of the SIMA program and was ranked as the 41st ranked player nationally by topdrawersoccer coming out of his senior season.

On 17 March 2017, Kizza committed to playing college soccer with the Pittsburgh Panthers, despite looking at offers from the Clemson Tigers and Wake Forest Demon Deacons. He made his collegiate debut for the Panthers on 25 August 2017 against the Ohio State Buckeyes, coming on as a substitute in a 0–1 defeat. He completed his freshman college season with 4 goals in 15 matches, earning an ACC All-Freshman team selection. During his sophomore season, Kizza started in all 18 matches for the Panthers, scoring 15 goals. He then scored 12 goals during his junior and final season with the Panthers, appearing in all 20 matches that season.

On 8 October 2020, it was announced that Kizza had parted ways with the Pittsburgh Panthers, despite appearing and scoring in two exhibition matches. He would go on to not play his senior season with the Panthers.

New England Revolution
On 21 January 2021, despite not appearing in the 2020 NCAA season, Kizza was selected with the 24th overall pick by the New England Revolution in the MLS SuperDraft. Despite being selected late in the first round of the draft, Revolution head coach Bruce Arena, stated that Kizza is "a proven goal scorer the collegiate level" and that "we feel very fortunate that we got him as late as we did in the first round". Arena said that he had spoken with Kizza's Pittsburgh Panthers coach Jay Vidovich prior to drafting him.

On 5 March 2021, Kizza signed a professional contract with the New England Revolution after impressing the coaching staff in pre-season. He made professional debut for the Revolution on 17 April 2021 in their season opener against the Chicago Fire, coming on as an 83rd-minute substitute in the 2–2 draw and hitting the crossbar with a header.

Following the 2022 season, Kizza was released by New England.

Memphis 901 (loan)
On 30 March 2022, New England announced that they had loaned Kizza to USL Championship club Memphis 901 for the remainder of the 2022 season. Kizza was recalled from his loan in July 2022.

Pittsburgh Riverhounds (loan)
On 15 July 2022, USL Championship club Pittsburgh Riverhounds SC announced that they had acquired Kizza on loan for the remainder of the 2022 season.

Pittsburgh Riverhounds
On 13 January 2023, Kizza made his move to the Riverhounds permanent.

Career statistics

Honours
New England Revolution
 Supporters' Shield: 2021

References

External links
 Profile at New England Revolution

1998 births
Living people
Ugandan footballers
Association football forwards
Pittsburgh Panthers men's soccer players
New England Revolution players
New England Revolution II players
Major League Soccer players
USL League One players
Ugandan expatriate footballers
Expatriate soccer players in the United States
Sportspeople from Kampala
Memphis 901 FC players
Pittsburgh Riverhounds SC players